Digeren is a lake in Innlandet county, Norway. The  lake lies in the municipality of Kongsvinger and a very small part extends over into Eidskog municipality to the south.

See also
List of lakes in Norway

References

Eidskog
Kongsvinger
Lakes of Innlandet